MBFC may refer to:

 Marina Bay Financial Centre, mixed-use development located along Marina Boulevard and Central Boulevard at Marina Bay, Singapore
 Media Bias/Fact Check, fact-checking organisation and web site that reviews news and media organisations according to political bias and factual reporting
 Mount Barker Football Club, Australia